Choctaw Creek is a stream in the U.S. state of Mississippi. It is a tributary to Bayou Pierre.

Choctaw Creek is named after the Choctaw people.

References

Rivers of Mississippi
Rivers of Copiah County, Mississippi
Mississippi placenames of Native American origin